Mavi-ye Olya (also Romanized as Māvī-ye ‘Olyā; also known as Māvī and Māvī-ye Bālā) is a village in Seydun-e Jonubi Rural District, Seydun District, Bagh-e Malek County, Khuzestan Province, Iran. At the 2006 census, its population was 191, in 40 families.

References 

Populated places in Bagh-e Malek County